3-Epi-6-deoxocathasterone 23-monooxygenase (cytochrome P450 90C1, CYP90D1, CYP90C1) is an enzyme with systematic name 3-epi-6-deoxocathasterone,NADPH:oxygen oxidoreductase (C-23-hydroxylating). This enzyme catalyses the following chemical reaction

 (1) 3-epi-6-deoxocathasterone + NADPH + H+ + O2   6-deoxotyphasterol + NADP+ + H2O
 (2) (22S,24R)-22-hydroxy-5alpha-ergostan-3-one + NADPH + H+ + O2  3-dehydro-6-deoxoteasterone + NADP+ + H2O

3-Epi-6-deoxocathasterone 23-monooxygenase takes part in brassinosteroid biosynthesis.

References

External links 
 

EC 1.14.13